Deidre Karen Anderson  (born 22 May 1957) is an Australian academic administrator, sports executive, sports transitions specialist and coach. Until May 2017 she was the  Deputy Vice-Chancellor (Students and Registrar) at Macquarie University. She is co-founder and Director of the Performance and Transition Institute (PTI) and consults regularly on performance and wellbeing of athletes around the world.

Sports
Anderson is known for advising elite athletes, including Cathy Freeman and swimmer Ian Thorpe on his decisions to stop competing in 2006 and his subsequent brief comeback in 2011. She received a Services to Sport award in 2008 from Australian University Sports. She has worked with the Scottish Institute of Sport, Australian Institute of Sport and UK Sport. She is a Director of Ausrapid. She succeeded Janice Crosswhite as President of the Australian Womensport and Recreation Association from March 2014 until October 2015. Appointed independent Director to the Rugby League Players Association in 2016.

University career
Anderson earned her Ph.D.in 2017 graduating from Macquarie University in Sydney. She also obtained a BA (1989) and master's degree (1999) from the Victoria University of Technology, who awarded her the Distinguished Alumni Award in 2014. She joined Macquarie University as chief executive of sport and recreation in 2003. In 2007 she became CEO of Macquarie's student services, and in August 2011 became a Deputy Vice-Chancellor. She was involved in legal action against the Macquarie University Postgraduate Representatives Association.

Anderson was appointed a Member of the Order of Australia (AM) in the 2022 Queen's Birthday Honours.

References

External links
 
 Deidre Anderson on Threat and Risk assessments, IIR Interview, April 2011

1957 births
Living people
Australian sports coaches
Members of the Order of Australia
Macquarie University people
Victoria University, Melbourne alumni
Sports psychologists